Rhodium-platinum oxide (Rh–Pt oxide), or Nishimura's catalyst, is an inorganic compound used as a hydrogenation catalyst.

Uses
Rh–Pt oxide is used to reduce various aromatic compounds to their respective cycloalkanes or saturated heterocycles under mild conditions (i.e. often at room temperature and atmospheric pressure). In this application, Rh–Pt oxide is superior to other group 10 catalysts such as platinum dioxide. Furthermore, the catalyst can be used to carryout the reaction with minimal losses of oxygen containing functional groups via hydrogenolysis.

Preparation
An aqueous solution of rhodium chloride, chloroplatinic acid, and sodium nitrate is evaporated and then fused in a porcelain dish between 460-480°C until the oxides of nitrogen cease (≈10 minutes). The resulting solidified mass is then washed with distilled water and dilute sodium nitrate followed by drying with calcium chloride to yield the catalyst. Typically the ratio of metals used for the catalyst is 3:1 Rh/Pt or 7:3 Rh/Pt.

See also
Rhodium-catalyzed hydrogenation
Rhodium(III) oxide
Wilkinson's catalyst
Platinum black
Platinum on carbon
Palladium on carbon
Birch reduction

References

Hydrogenation catalysts
Rhodium(III) compounds
Platinum(IV) compounds
Transition metal oxides